Mathew Fogarty (born 30 October 1956) is an American male badminton player who has specialized in doubles events. He has shared the men's double title in four U.S. National Badminton Championships (1980, 1984, 1986, 2000) with three different partners. In 1985, Partnering with Bruce Pontow from Chicago Illinois, coming out of retirement after 2 years, Pontow and Fogarty established the greatest “Underdog” defeat in Men's Doubles history defeating Korean All-England Champions Kim Moon-soo and Lee Deuk-choon in Thomas Cup held in Vancouver, Canada after the Men's Team with Legendary coach and player Park Joo-bong challenged into and winning the Pan American Zone. The victory by far the best an Unranked pair competed against the best in the world during the era from 1985 until 1991 Korea Dominated World Badminton by winning many of the All-England  doubles events (Women's, Men's and Mixed Doubles) with 16 wins to Korea, 4 to China, and 1 win to Nora Perry from England and Billy Gilliland from Scotland. In 2008, he won the bronze medal at the Pan Am Badminton Championships in the mixed team event. He also won the men's doubles bronze medal in 2009 and 2014. In 2015, at age 58, Fogarty became the oldest shuttler competing at the BWF World Championships at the Istora Senayan Indoor Stadium, Jakarta. He has been qualified for the BWF World Championships seven times. He practiced six days a week after work to maintain his fitness. Fogarty works as a Physician by practice in the US Navy.

Achievements

Pan Am Championships 2 
Men's Doubles

BWF International Challenge/Series 
Men's Doubles

Mixed Doubles

 BWF International Challenge tournament
 BWF International Series tournament
 BWF Future Series tournament

References

External links 
 

1956 births
Living people
American male badminton players
Badminton players at the 1999 Pan American Games
Pan American Games competitors for the United States